Tseng Chun-hsin was the defending champion but chose not to defend his title.

Luca Van Assche won the title after defeating Maximilian Neuchrist 3–6, 6–4, 6–0 in the final.

Seeds

Draw

Finals

Top half

Bottom half

References

External links
Main draw
Qualifying draw

Maia Challenger - 1